"Power to the People" is a song written by John Lennon, released as a single in 1971, credited to John Lennon/Plastic Ono Band. It was issued on Apple Records (catalogue number R5892 in the United Kingdom, 1830 in the United States) and in the US peaked at number 11 on the Billboard Hot 100 and number 10 on the Cashbox Top 100. It also charted at number 6 on the British singles chart. The song's first appearance on album was the 1975 compilation Shaved Fish.

The song was used as a campaign theme song for the 2016 and the 2020 U.S. presidential campaigns of Bernie Sanders.

Writing and recording
"Power to the People" was recorded at Ascot Sound Studios on 15 February 1971, during sessions that would produce songs for Lennon's Imagine album. The single was released on 12 March 1971 in the UK and 22 March 1971 in the US (although some sources give the British release as 8 March). The song was written by Lennon in response to an interview he gave to Tariq Ali and Robin Blackburn, published in Red Mole (8–22 March 1971). As Lennon explained: "I just felt inspired by what they said, although a lot of it is gobbledygook. So I wrote 'Power to the People' the same way I wrote 'Give Peace a Chance,' as something for the people to sing. I make singles like broadsheets. It was another quickie, done at Ascot."

It entered the charts on 20 March 1971, and remained there for nine weeks. It was Lennon's fifth solo single, the Plastic Ono Band on this occasion comprising Lennon, Bobby Keys and Billy Preston in addition to regulars Klaus Voormann and Alan White. Backing vocals were supplied by Rosetta Hightower and "44 others".  The singers also stomped their feet to make it sound more like a political rally. Phil Spector, Lennon and Yoko Ono were credited as producers.

Lennon's regard for the song changed during the 1970s. In Skywriting by Word of Mouth, he called the song "rather embarrassing" and supported Hunter S. Thompson's claim that the anthem was "ten years too late". In 1980, he stated that the song "didn't really come off" as it had been "written in the state of being asleep and wanting to be loved by Tariq Ali and his ilk".

Ultimate Classic Rock critic Nick DeRiso rated it as Lennon's 6th greatest solo political song, calling it "one of Lennon's funkiest and hardest-hitting musical achievements."

Cover versions and references
The Minus 5 recorded a version of "Power to the People" for the 1995 tribute album Working Class Hero: A Tribute to John Lennon. In 2000, Eric Burdon, Billy Preston and Ringo Starr recorded the song for Steal This Movie!, a film about Abbie Hoffman.

The song has been used as a theme song of the 2016 and 2020 US presidential campaigns of Bernie Sanders.

Personnel
The musicians who performed on "Power to the People" were as follows:
John Lennon - vocals, electric guitar, piano
Klaus Voormann - bass guitar
Bobby Keys - saxophone
Jim Gordon - drums
Rosetta Hightower and others - backing vocals

Chart history

Weekly charts

Year-end charts

References

John Lennon songs
Eric Burdon songs
Apple Records singles
Song recordings produced by Phil Spector
1971 singles
Protest songs
Songs written by John Lennon
Song recordings produced by John Lennon
Song recordings produced by Yoko Ono
Bernie Sanders 2016 presidential campaign
Bernie Sanders 2020 presidential campaign
Plastic Ono Band songs